Acanthogobio guentheri is a species of cyprinid fish endemic to China.  It is only found in the Yellow and Sinin Rivers, and is the only recognized species in its genus. It reaches up to a length of 20 cm.

Named in honor of the German-born British ichthyologist and herpetologist Albert Günther (1830–1914).

References

Cyprinid fish of Asia
Gobioninae
Freshwater fish of China
Taxa named by Solomon Herzenstein
Fish described in 1892